De Mulieribus Claris or De Claris Mulieribus (Latin for "Concerning Famous Women") is a collection of biographies of historical and mythological women by the Florentine author Giovanni Boccaccio, composed in Latin prose in 1361–1362. It is notable as the first collection devoted exclusively to biographies of women in post-ancient Western literature. At the same time as he was writing On Famous Women, Boccaccio also compiled a collection of biographies of famous men, De Casibus Virorum Illustrium (On the Fates of Famous Men).

Purpose

Boccaccio claimed to have written the 106 biographies for the posterity of the women who were considered renowned, whether good or bad. He believed that recounting the deeds of certain women who may have been wicked would be offset by the exhortations to virtue by the deeds of good women. He writes in his presentation of this combination of all types of women that he hoped it would encourage virtue and curb vice.

Overview
The author declares in the preface that this collection of 106 short biographies (104 chapters) of women is the first example in Western literature devoted solely and exclusively to women. Some of the lost works of Suetonius' "illustrious people" and Boccaccio's De Casibus Virorum Illustrium are a mixture of women and men, where others like Petrarch's De Viris Illustribus and Jerome's De Viris Illustribus are biographies of exclusively men. Boccaccio himself even says this work was inspired and modeled on Petrarch's De Viris Illustribus.

Development

Boccaccio wrote this work in Certaldo probably between the summer of 1361 and the summer of 1362, although it could have been as late as December 1362. He dedicated his work to Andrea Acciaioli, Countess of Altavilla, in Naples at the end of 1362 even though he continued to revise it up until his death in 1375. She was not his first choice however. He first considered to dedicate his slim volume to Joanna I of Naples. He ultimately decided that his work as a little book was not worthy a person of such great fame.

There are over 100 surviving manuscripts which shows that the De Mulieribus Claris was "among the most popular works in the last age of the manuscript book". Boccaccio worked on this as a labor of love with several versions, editions, and rearrangements in the last twenty years or so of his life: studies have identified at least nine stages in its composition. In the last part of the 14th century after Boccaccio died, a Donato degli Albanzani had a copy that his friend Boccaccio gave him and translated it from Latin into Italian.

Content

The 106 Famous Women biographies are of mythological and historical women, as well as some of Boccaccio's Renaissance contemporaries. The brief life stories follow the same general exemplary literature patterns used in various versions of De viris illustribus. The biography pattern starts with the name of the person, then the parents or ancestors, then their rank or social position, and last the general reason for their notoriety or fame with associated details. This is sometimes interjected with a philosophical or inspirational lesson at the end.

The only sources that Boccaccio specifically says he used are Saint Paul (no. 42), the Bible (no. 43) and Jerome (no. 86). The wording of the biographies themselves, however, provide hints about where he obtained his information. He clearly had access to works of the classical authors Valerius Maximus, Pliny, Livy, Ovid, Suetonius, Statius, Virgil, Lactantius, Orosius, and Justinus.

Influence 
Boccaccio's collection of female biographies inspired characters in Christine de Pizan's The Book of the City of Ladies (1405) In the early part of the 15th century Antonio di S. Lupidio made a volgare translation and Laurent de Premierfait published it in French as Des cleres et nobles femmes. Boccaccio's biographies also inspired Alvaro de Luna's De las virtuosas y claras mujeres, Thomas Elyot's Defence of Good Women, Alonso of Cartagena's De las mujeres ilustres, Giovanni Sabbadino degli Arienti's Gynevera de la clare donne, Iacopo Filippo Foresti's De plurimis claris selectisque mulierbus and Jean Lemaire's Couronne margaritique. In England, Edmund Spenser used Boccaccio's De Mulieribus Claris as inspiration and the famous women influenced Geoffrey Chaucer's Legend of Good Women and The Canterbury Tales (1387-1400). In 1494 an anonymous Spanish translation, Johan Bocacio De las mujeres ilustres en romance, was published at Zaragoza by Paulo Hurus. In the beginning of the 16th century a Henry Parker translated about half into English and dedicated it to Henry VIII. In the 16th century, new Italian translations by Luca Antonio Ridolfi and Giuseppe Betussi were published. 

In Germany De Mulieribus Claris was widely distributed as manuscript. The first printed book of the Latin language original was produced in the workshop of Johann Zainer and was published decorated with woodcut miniatures in 1473. This 1473 edition was the first Latin version printed. The only complete 16th century printed Latin version to survive is from a Mathias Apiarus done around 1539. The German translation by Heinrich Steinhöwel was printed and published also by Zainer in 1474. The book became so popular that in the subsequent hundred years the Steinhöwel translation was republished in six editions. Steinhöwel had added geographic relevance, by placing the Amazons in Swabia.

The famous women 

1. Eve, the first woman in the Bible
2. Semiramis, queen of the Assyrians
3. Opis, wife of Saturn
4. Juno, goddess of the Kingdoms
5. Ceres, goddess of the harvest and queen of Sicily
6. Minerva
7. Venus, queen of Cyprus
8. Isis, queen and goddess of Egypt
9. Europa, queen of Crete
10. Libya, queen of Libya
11 and 12. Marpesia and Lampedo, queens of the Amazons
13. Thisbe, a Babylonian maiden
14. Hypermnestra, queen of the Argives and priestess of Juno
15. Niobe, queen of Thebes
16. Hypsipyle, queen of Lemnos
17. Medea, queen of Colchis
18. Arachne of Colophon
19 and 20. Orithyia and Antiope, queens of the Amazons
21. Erythraea or Heriphile, a Sibyl
22. Medusa, daughter of Phorcus
23. Iole, daughter of the king of the Aetolians
24. Deianira, wife of Hercules
25. Jocasta, queen of Thebes
26. Almathea or Deiphebe, a Sibyl
27. Nicostrata, or Carmenta, daughter of King Ionius
28. Procris, wife of Cephalus
29. Argia, wife of Polynices and daughter of King Adrastus
30. Manto, daughter of Tiresias
31. The wives of the Minyans
32. Penthesilea, queen of the Amazons
33. Polyxena, daughter of King Priam
34. Hecuba, queen of the Trojans
35. Cassandra, daughter of King Priam of Troy
36. Clytemnestra, queen of Mycenae
37. Helen of Troy, whose abduction by Paris began the Trojan War
38. Circe, daughter of the Sun
39. Camilla, queen of the Volscians
40. Penelope, wife of Ulysses
41. Lavinia, queen of Laurentum
42. Dido, or Elissa, queen of Carthage
43. Nicaula, queen of Ethiopia
44. Pamphile, daughter of Platea
45. Rhea Ilia, a Vestal Virgin
46. Gaia Cyrilla (Tanaquil), wife of King Tarquinius Priscus
47. Sappho, woman of Lesbos and poet
48. Lucretia, wife of Collatinus
49. Tamyris, queen of Scythia
50. Leaena, a courtesan
51. Athaliah, queen of Jerusalem
52. Cloelia, a Roman maiden
53. Hippo, a Greek woman
54. Megullia Dotata
55. Veturia, a Roman matron
56. Thamyris, daughter of Micon
57. A conflation of Artemisia II and Artemisia I, queens of Caria
58. Verginia, virgin and daughter of Virginius
59. Eirene, daughter of Cratinus
60. Leontium
61. Olympias, queen of Macedonia
62. Claudia, a Vestal Virgin
63. Virginia, wife of Lucius Volumnius
64. Flora, goddess of flowers and wife of Zephyrus
65. A young Roman woman
66. Marcia, daughter of Varro
67. Sulpicia, wife of Quintus Fulvius Flaccus
68. Harmonia, daughter of Gelon, son of Hiero II of Syracuse
69. Busa of Canosa di Puglia
70. Sophonisba, queen of Numidia
71. Theoxena, daughter of Prince Herodicus
72. Berenice, queen of Cappadocia
73. The Wife of Orgiagon the Galatian
74. Tertia Aemilia, wife of the elder Africanus
75. Dripetrua, queen of Laodice
76. Sempronia, daughter of Gracchus
77. Claudia Quinta, a Roman woman
78. Hypsicratea, Queen of Pontus
79. Sempronia, a Roman Woman
80. The Wives of the Cimbrians
81. Julia, daughter of the dictator Julius Caesar
82. Portia, daughter of Cato Uticensis
83. Curia, wife of Quintus Lucretius
84. Hortensia, daughter of Quintus Hortensius
85. Sulpicia, wife of Cruscellio
86. Cornificia, a poet
87. Mariamme, queen of Judaea
88. Cleopatra, queen of Egypt
89. Antonia, daughter of Antony
90. Agrippina, wife of Germanicus
91. Paulina, a Roman woman
92. Agrippina, mother of the Emperor Nero
93. Epicharis, a freedwoman
94. Pompeia Paulina, wife of Seneca
95. Poppaea Sabina, wife of Nero
96. Triaria, wife of Lucius Vitellius
97. Proba, wife of Adelphus
98. Faustina Augusta
99. Symiamira, woman of Emesa
100. Zenobia, queen of Palmyra
101. Joan, an Englishwoman and Pope
102. Irene, Empress of Constantinople
103. Gualdrada, a Florentine maiden
104. Constance, Empress of Rome and queen of Sicily
105. Camiola, a Sienese widow
106. Joanna, queen of Jerusalem and Sicily

References

Citations

Bibliography

Further reading

Primary sources
Boccaccio, Poeet Ende Philosophe, Bescrivende van den Doorluchtighen, Glorioesten ende Edelsten Vrouwen (Antwerp, 1525)
Boccaccio, Tractado de John Bocacio, de las Claras, Excellentes y Mas Famosas y Senaladas Damas (Zaragoza, 1494)
Boccaccio, De la Louenge et Vertu des Nobles et Cleres Dames (Paris, 1493)
Boccaccio, De Preclaris Mulieribus (Strassburg, 1475)
Boccaccio, De Preclaris Mulieribus (Louvain, 1487)
Boccaccio, De Mulieribus Claris (Bern, 1539)
Boccaccio, De Mulieribus Claris (Ulm, 1473)
Boccaccio, French translation (Paris, 1405)

Secondary sources
Schleich, G. ed., Die mittelenglische Umdichtung von Boccaccio De claris mulieribus, nebst der latinischen Vorlage, Palaestra (Leipzig, 1924)
Wright, H.G., ed., Translated from Boccaccio's De Claris Mulieribus, Early English Text Society, Original series w/Latin (London, 1943)
Guarino, G. A., Boccaccio, Concerning Famous Women (New Brunswick, N.J., 1963)
Zaccaria, V., ed., De mulieribus claris with Italian translation (Milan, 1967 and 1970)
Branca, V., ed., Tutte le opere di Giovani Boccaccio, volume 10 (1967)
Zaccaria, V., ed., De mulieribus claris, Studi sul Boccaccio (Milan, 1963)
Franklin, M., Boccaccio's Heroines: Power and Virtue in Renaissance Society (2006)
Filosa, E., Tre Studi sul De mulieribus claris (2012)

External links

 The Genealogy of Women: Studies in Boccaccio's De mulieribus claris 
 The ghost of Boccaccio: writings on famous women in Renaissance Italy
 Its publishing development history by Guyda Armstrong of Brown University 

14th-century Latin books
Biographical dictionaries of women
Cultural depictions of Helen of Troy
Depictions of Cleopatra in literature
Cultural depictions of Dido
Cultural depictions of Sappho
Cultural depictions of Agrippina the Elder
Cultural depictions of Agrippina the Younger
Cultural depictions of Poppaea Sabina
Cultural depictions of Cloelia
Cultural depictions of Tanaquil
Cultural depictions of Sempronia (wife of Decimus Brutus)
Latin biographies
Works by Giovanni Boccaccio
Joanna I of Naples